Ruffato is an Italian surname. Notable people with the surname include:

 Clodovaldo Ruffato (born 1953), Italian politician
 Luiz Ruffato (born 1961), Brazilian author

Italian-language surnames